The Spheginina is a subtribe of hoverflies.

List of genera 
Austroascia Thompson & Marnef, 1977
Chamaesphegina Shannon & Aubertin, 1933
Neoascia Williston, 1887
Sphegina Meigen, 1822

References 

Eristalinae
Insect subtribes